Sudrasan village is located in Didwana Tehsil of Nagaur district in Rajasthan, India. As per 2009 stats, Sudrasan village is also a gram panchayat.

Pin code is 341551. The total population is 3,910. There are about 671 houses in Sudrasan village. Local languages include Marwari, Hindi, English, Urdu and Rajasthani.

Demography

References

External links
 Official website of Surjal Mata at Sudrasan: https://www.surjalmata.in/

Villages in Nagaur district